Ficus elastica, the rubber fig, rubber bush, rubber tree, rubber plant, or Indian rubber bush, Indian rubber tree, is a species of flowering plant in the family Moraceae, native to eastern parts of South and Southeast Asia. It has become naturalized in Sri Lanka, the West Indies, and the US state of Florida.

Description
The trunk develops aerial and buttressing roots to anchor it in the soil and help support heavy branches.

The leaves develop inside a sheath at the apical meristem, which grows larger as the new leaf develops. When it is mature, it unfurls and the sheath drops off the plant. Inside the new leaf, another immature leaf is waiting to develop.

Pollination and fruiting
As with other members of the genus Ficus, the flowers require a particular species of fig wasp to pollinate it in a co-evolved relationship. Because of this relationship, the rubber plant does not produce highly colourful or fragrant flowers to attract other pollinators.

Range
The natural range of F. elastica extends from Nepal in the north to Indonesia, Bhutan, Northeastern India, Myanmar, Yunnan in China, and Malaysia. It has been widely introduced in most tropical regions of the world, including Hawaii and the West Indies. In Europe, it can be found in mild locations throughout the Mediterranean Basin.

Cultivation and uses

In parts of India, people guide the roots of the tree over chasms to eventually form living bridges. To this day there are large bridges woven from aerial roots in Meghalaya, India. Although the trees used for these bridges are very large, aerial roots can be found on Ficus elastica as small as 1ft tall.

Ornamental

Ficus elastica is grown around the world as an ornamental plant, outside in frost-free climates (though it also tolerates light frosts) from the tropical to the Mediterranean and inside in colder climates as a houseplant. Although it is grown in Hawaii, the species of fig wasp required to allow it to spread naturally is not present there.

Most cultivated plants are produced by vegetative propagation. This can be done by cuttings or by layering.

All parts of the plant contain an abundant milky white latex, which has been tested for use in the manufacture of rubber, but without economic and technical results; commercial rubber is actually produced from the sap of the Hevea brasiliensis.

In cultivation, it prefers bright sunlight but not hot temperatures. It has a high tolerance for drought, but prefers humidity and thrives in wet, tropical conditions. Ornamental hybrids (such as Robusta) have been derived from Ficus elastica with broader, stiffer and more upright leaves than the wild form. Many such hybrids exist, often with variegated leaves.

Latex
Ficus elastica yields a milky white latex, a chemical compound separate from its sap and carried and stored in different cells. This latex was formerly used to make rubber, but it should not be confused with the Pará rubber tree (Hevea brasiliensis), the main commercial source of latex for rubber making. Just as with Hevea brasiliensis, the latex of Ficus elastica is an irritant to the eyes and skin and is toxic if taken internally.

Gallery

References

elastica
Epiphytes
House plants
Ornamental trees
Flora of tropical Asia
Plants described in 1819